The Afar language (also known as ’Afar Af, Afaraf, Qafar af) is an Afroasiatic language belonging to the Cushitic branch. It is spoken by the Afar people inhabiting Djibouti, Eritrea and Ethiopia.

Classification
Afar is classified within the Cushitic branch of the Afroasiatic family. It is further categorized in the Lowland East Cushitic sub-group, along with Saho and Somali. Its closest relative is the Saho language.

Geographic distribution
The Afar language is spoken as a mother tongue by the Afar people in Djibouti, Eritrea, and the Afar Region of Ethiopia.

According to Ethnologue, there are  total Afar speakers. Of these, 1,280,000 were recorded in the 2007 Ethiopian census, with 906,000 monolinguals registered in the 1994 census.

Official status
In Djibouti, Afar is a recognized national language. It is also one of the broadcasting languages of the Radio Television of Djibouti public network.

In Eritrea, Afar is recognized as one of nine national languages which formally enjoy equal status although Tigrinya and Arabic are by far of greatest significance in official usage. There are daily broadcasts on the national radio and a translated version of the Eritrean constitution. In education, however, Afar speakers prefer Arabic – which many of them speak as a second language – as the language of instruction. 

In the Afar Region of Ethiopia, Afar is also recognized as an official working language. Since 2020, Afar is one of the five official working languages of Ethiopia.

Phonology

Consonants
The consonants of the Afar language in the standard orthography are listed below (with IPA notation in brackets):

Voiceless stop consonants which close syllables are released, e.g., .

Vowels and stress

Sentence final vowels of affirmative verbs are aspirated (and stressed), e.g.
  =  'He did.'
Sentence final vowels of negative verbs are not aspirated (nor stressed), e.g.
  =  'He did not do.'
Sentence final vowels of interrogative verbs are lengthened (and stressed), e.g.
  =  'Did he do?'
Otherwise, stress in word-final.

Phonotactics
Possible syllable shapes are V, VV, VC, VVC, CV, CVV and CVVC.

Syntax
As in most other Cushitic languages, the basic word order in Afar is subject–object–verb.

Writing system
In Ethiopia, Afar used to be written with the Ge'ez script (Ethiopic script). Since around 1849, the Latin script has been used in other areas to transcribe the language. Additionally, Afar is also transcribed using the Arabic script.

In the early 1970s, two Afar intellectuals and nationalists, Dimis and Redo, formalized the Afar alphabet. Known as Qafar Feera, the orthography is based on the Latin script.

Officials from the Institut des Langues de Djibouti, the Eritrean Ministry of Education, and the Ethiopian Afar Language Studies and Enrichment Center have since worked with Afar linguists, authors and community representatives to select a standard orthography for Afar from among the various existing writing systems used to transcribe the language.

Latin alphabet

See also

Afar people
Afar Region

Notes

Bibliography
 Loren F. Bliese.  1976. "Afar", The Non-Semitic Languages of Ethiopia.  Ed. Lionel M. Bender.  Ann Arbor, Michigan: African Studies Center, Michigan State University. Pages 133–164.
 Loren F. Bliese.  1981. A generative grammar of Afar.  Summer Institute of Linguistics publications in linguistics vol. 65.   Dallas:  Summer Institute of Linguistics and The University of Texas at Arlington. .
 J. G. Colby.  1970.  "Notes on the northern dialect of the Afar language", Journal of Ethiopian Studies 8:1–8.
 R. J. Hayward and Enid M. Parker.  1985.  Afar-English-French dictionary with Grammatical Notes in English.  London:  School of Oriental and African Studies, University of London.
 Richard J. Hayward. 1998.  "Qafar (West Cushitic)", Handbook of Morphology.  Ed. A. Spencer and A. Zwicky.  Oxford:  Blackwell.  Pages 624–647.
 Didier Morin. 1997. Poésie traditionnelle des Afars.  Langues et cultures africaines, 21 / SELAF vol. 363.  Paris/Louvain: Peeters.
 Enid M. Parker. 2006. English–Afar Dictionary.  Washington DC:  Dunwoody Press.
 Rainer M. Voigt. 1975. "Bibliographie des Saho–Afar", Africana Marburgensia 8:53–63.

External links

World Atlas of Language Structures information on Qafar
Afar language learning web site  (Much information about Afar, in English and French)
Omniglot - Afar (ʿAfár af)

Afar people
East Cushitic languages
Languages of Djibouti
Languages of Eritrea
Languages of Ethiopia